Charlotte Corday is a 1919 German silent historical drama film directed by Frederic Zelnik and starring Lya Mara and Hermann Vallentin. No surviving copies are known.

Cast
Lya Mara as Charlotte Corday
Hermann Vallentin
Wiktor Biegański
Hermann Seldeneck

References

External links

Films of the Weimar Republic
Films directed by Frederic Zelnik
German silent feature films
German black-and-white films
French Revolution films
German historical films
1910s historical films
1910s German films